John Hastie (16 March 1908 – 19 January 1965) was a Scotland international rugby union player. He played as a Hooker.

Rugby union career

Amateur career

Hastie played for Melrose.

He was the third Melrose player to be capped for Scotland; after J.R. Lawrie and J. W. Allan.

He played for the Co-Optimists in March 1939 against Cambridge University Vandals. Unfortunately he was injured in the match, and went off with an injured knee.

He also played for the Army.

Provincial career

Hastie was a substitute used in the Scotland Probables side for the second and final trial match of that season, on 15 January 1938

He played for South of Scotland District in 1939.

International career

Hastie was capped by Scotland 3 times, all in 1938.

He was later capped for Scotland in a military services team to played England Services.

Administrative career

In 1950 and 1951, he was the Vice-President of Melrose RFC.

He became President of Melrose RFC in 1952.

He was also a selector for South of Scotland District.

References

1908 births
1965 deaths
Rugby union players from Peebles
Scottish rugby union players
Scotland international rugby union players
Scotland Possibles players
Melrose RFC players
Rugby union hookers